Olympique de Marseille won Division 1 season 1936/1937 of the French Association Football League with 38 points.

Participating teams

 FC Antibes
 AS Cannes
 SC Fives
 Olympique Lillois
 Olympique de Marseille
 FC Metz
 FC Mulhouse
 RC Paris
 Red Star Olympique
 Stade Rennais UC
 Excelsior AC Roubaix
 RC Roubaix
 FC Rouen
 FC Sète
 FC Sochaux-Montbéliard
 RC Strasbourg

Final table

Promoted from Division 2, who will play in Division 1 season 1937/1938:
 RC Lens: Champion of Division 2
 US Valenciennes-Anzin: Runner-up Division 2

Results

Top goalscorers

References
 Division 1 season 1936-1937 at pari-et-gagne.com

Ligue 1 seasons
France
1